Goat River station is a railway station in Goat River, British Columbia. It is on the Canadian National Railway mainline and serves Via Rail's Jasper–Prince Rupert train as a flag stop.

Footnotes

External links 
Via Rail Station Description

Via Rail stations in British Columbia